Flowers of the Field is a 2020 Canadian drama film, directed by Andrew Stanley. The film stars Alex Crowther as Aaron Warner, a young man struggling with his sexual orientation who checks himself into a conversion therapy program run by therapist John (Ryan Hollyman).

The cast also includes Sharon McFarlane, James McDougall, Kristopher Turner and Jesse LaVercombe.

The film premiered at the 2020 Vancouver International Film Festival.

Crowther received a Vancouver Film Critics Circle nomination for Best Actor in a Canadian Film at the Vancouver Film Critics Circle Awards 2020.

References

External links

2020 films
2020 drama films
2020 LGBT-related films
Canadian drama films
Canadian LGBT-related films
LGBT-related drama films
Gay-related films
English-language Canadian films
Films shot in Toronto
2020s English-language films
2020s Canadian films